

A

 Peter Abelard – French philosopher
 Edmond François Valentin About – French novelist and journalist
 Mikola Abramchyk – Belarusian journalist and emigre politician
 Agustarello Affre – French operatic tenor
 Marie d'Agoult – French author who wrote under the nom de plume of Daniel Stern
 Avetis Aharonyan – Armenian politician, writer and public figure
 Chantal Akerman – Belgian filmmaker and writer
 Jehan Alain – French composer and organist
 Marietta Alboni – Italian opera singer
 Jean-Charles Adolphe Alphand – French civil engineer
 Émilie Ambre – French opera singer
 Elena Andreianova – Russian ballerina
 Andranik – Armenian military commander and statesman; remains transferred to Armenia in 2000.
 Karel Appel – Dutch painter
 Guillaume Apollinaire – French poet and art critic
 François Arago – French scientist and statesman
 Arman (Armand Fernandez) – French painter
 Miguel Ángel Asturias – Guatemalan diplomat and author, won the Nobel Prize for Literature in 1967
 Philip Astley – father of the modern circus
 Daniel Auber – French composer
 Hubertine Auclert – French feminist and activist for women's suffrage
 Pierre Augereau – French military commander and Marshal of France
 Jean-Pierre Aumont – French actor, father of Tina Aumont and husband of Maria Montez
 Jane Avril – French dancer

B

 Salvador Bacarisse – Spanish composer
 Honoré de Balzac – French novelist of the 19th century
 Joseph Barbanègre – French general
 Henri Barbusse – French novelist
 Paul Barras – French statesman
 Antoine-Louis Barye – French sculptor
 Alain Bashung – French singer
 Stiv Bators – ashes sprinkled on the grave of Jim Morrison
 Paul Baudry –  French painter
 Jean-Dominique Bauby – French journalist
 Jean-Louis Baudelocque – French obstetrician
 Pierre-Augustin Caron De Beaumarchais – French playwright
 Félix de Beaujour – French diplomat, politician and historian
 Gilbert Bécaud – French singer
 Pierre Augustin Béclard – French anatomist
 Vincenzo Bellini – Italian composer; remains later transferred to Italy
 Hans Bellmer – German (French) surrealist photographer, sculptor, draughtsman
 Judah P. Benjamin – American lawyer and statesman
 Pierre-Jean de Béranger – French lyricist
 Claude Bernard – French physiologist, known for several advances in medicine, as the introduction of the scientific method to the study of medicine, and the study of the sympathetic nervous system.
 Bernardin de Saint Pierre – French writer
 Sarah Bernhardt – French stage and film actress
 Alphonse Bertillon – French anthropologist and father of anthropometry
 Julien Bessières – French scientist, diplomat and politician
 Ramón Emeterio Betances – Puerto Rican nationalist; remains returned to Puerto Rico in 1920.
 Bruno Bianchi – French animator, co-creator of Inspector Gadget
 Xavier Bichat – French anatomist and pathologist
 Fulgence Bienvenüe – French civil engineer remembered as the Father of the Paris Métro
Anne Bignan – French poet and translator
 Samuel Bing – German art dealer
 Georges Bizet – French composer and conductor
 Louis Blanc – French historian and statesman
 Sophie Blanchard – first professional female balloonist and the first woman to die in an aviation accident
 Auguste Blanqui – French revolutionary socialist.
 François-Adrien Boieldieu – French composer
 Rosa Bonheur – French painter
 Ludwig Börne – German political writer and satirist
 Paul Boucherot – French electrical engineer
Louis of Bourbon-Two Sicilies – Italian count
 Pierre Bourdieu – French sociologist
 Jean-Pierre Boyer – Second President of Haiti
 Brada - French writer
 Alexandrine-Caroline Branchu – French opera singer
 Édouard Branly – French scientist
 Pierre Brasseur – French comedian
 Yvonne de Bray – French actress
Januária of Brazil – Brazilian princess
 Jean Anthelme Brillat-Savarin – French lawyer, politician, epicure, and gastronome
 Alexandre-Théodore Brongniart – French architect, best known for designing the layout of the Pėre Lachaise Cemetery
 Pierre Brossolette – French journalist, politician and Résistance leader
 Jean de Brunhoff – French author of Babar the Elephant
 Auguste-Laurent Burdeau – French politician and plaintiff in the Drumont-Burdeau trial

C

 Emmanuel Cabut (Mano Solo) – French singer
 Marcel Cachin – French Communist politician 
 Joseph Caillaux – French statesman
 Gustave Caillebotte – French Impressionist painter
 Maria Callas – The opera singer's ashes were originally buried in the cemetery. After being stolen and later recovered, they were scattered into the Aegean Sea, off the coast of Greece. The empty urn remains in Père Lachaise.
 Lucienne Calvet, née Calmettes – Heroine of WWII, killed just before the Liberation of Paris in August 1944 when hanging a homemade tricolor flag from her window
 Sebastián Calvo de la Puerta y O'Farrill – governor of Spanish Louisiana
 Jean Jacques Régis de Cambacérès – French lawyer and politician
 Giulia Grisi de Candia – Italian opera singer, well known as "Giulia Grisi", her grave is marked Giullia de Candia.
 Jean-Joseph Carriès – French sculptor, ceramist, and miniaturist
 Pierre Cartellier – French sculptor
 Claude Chabrol – French film director
 Albert Champion – French road racing cyclist
 Jean-François Champollion – French decipherer of the hieroglyphs and father of Egyptology
 Claude Chappe – French pioneer of the telegraph
 Gustave Charpentier – French composer
 Ernest Chausson – French composer
 Jorge Chávez –  Peruvian aviator . His remains were here from 1 October 1910 to September 1957, when they were transferred to Lima, Perú
 Richard Chenevix – Irish chemist
 Luigi Cherubini – Italian composer
 Claude de Choiseul-Francières – Marshal of France
 Frédéric Chopin – Polish composer. His heart is entombed within a pillar at the Holy Cross Church in Warsaw.
Jean-Baptiste Clément – French songwriter and communard
 Auguste Clésinger – French painter and sculptor
 France Clidat – French pianist
 Émile Cohl – French cartoonist
 Colette – French novelist
 Count Alexandre Joseph Colonna-Walewski – French statesman (illegitimate son of Napoleon)
 Édouard Colonne – French conductor
 Auguste Comte – French thinker; father of Positivism
 Benjamin Constant – Swiss-born liberal philosopher
 Bruno Coquatrix – French lyricist and music impresario
 Jean-Baptiste-Camille Corot – French painter
 Ramón Corral – Mexican Politician, Vice-president from 1904 until 1911 under President Porfirio Díaz administration
 Jean-Pierre Cortot – French sculptor
 Benoît Costaz – French bishop
 Georges Courteline – French playwright
 Thomas Couture – French painter
 Guy Crescent - French businessman
 Régine Crespin – French opera singer
 Rufino José Cuervo – Colombian writer and philologue
 Nancy Cunard – English poet and activist
 Henri Curiel – Egyptian politician
 Georges Cuvier – the founder of paleontology
 Raleigh E. Colston – American Confederate States Army brigadier general

D

 Jarosław Dąbrowski – exiled Polish revolutionary Nationalist and last Commander-in-Chief of the Paris Commune of 1871; cenotaphs on Federated Wall in northeast corner of the Père Lachaise Cemetery and outside the wall in the Square Samuel de Champlain
 Pierre Dac – French humorist
 Édouard Daladier – French Radical-Socialist politician of the 1930s, signatory of the Munich Agreement in 1938 and Prime Minister of France at the outbreak of the Second World War
 Alexandre Darracq – French automobile manufacturer
 Alphonse Daudet – French author who is known for his literary works, such as Letters from My Windmill
 Honoré Daumier – French caricaturist
 Jacques-Louis David – Napoleon's court painter was exiled as a revolutionary after the Bourbons returned to the throne of France. His body was not allowed into the country even in death, so the tomb contains only his heart.
 David d'Angers – French sculptor
 Louis-Nicolas Davout – Napoleon's "Iron Marshal"
 Marpessa Dawn – African American and French actress, singer and dancer
 Gérard Debreu – French economist, won the Nobel Prize for Economics in 1983
 Jean-Gaspard Deburau – Czech-born French actor and mime
 Denis Decrès – French admiral and Naval Minister under Napoleon
 Cino Del Duca – Italian-born French publishing magnate, film producer and philanthropist
 Simone Del Duca – French businesswoman and philanthropist, wife of Cino Del Duca
 Élie-Miriam Delaborde – French virtuoso pianist and composer
 Eugène Delacroix – French Romantic artist
 Jean Baptiste Joseph Delambre – French mathematician
 Michel Delpech – French singer
 Pierre Dervaux – French conductor
 Pierre Desproges – French humorist
 Henry Edward Detmold – English painter and illustrator
 Gustave Doré – French artist and printmaker
 Michel Drach – French film director
 Marie Dubas – French singer
 Jacques Duclos – French communist politician
 Léon Dufourny – French architect
 Paul Dukas – French composer
 Isadora Duncan – American / Soviet dancer
 Henri Duparc – French composer
 Éléonore Duplay – Friend of French Revolutionary Maximilien Robespierre
 Guillaume Dupuytren – French surgeon
 Rosalie Duthé – French courtesan

E

 Suzanne Eisendieck – German painter
 Paul Éluard – French surrealist poet
 George Enescu – Romanian composer, pianist, violinist and conductor
 Gérard Encausse (Papus) – French physician, hypnotist, and popularizer of occultism, founder of the Martinist Order
 Camille Erlanger – French composer
 Max Ernst – German artist

F

 Alexandre Falguière – French sculptor
 Félix Faure – President of France
 Mehdi Favéris-Essadi – French DJ and musician
 Laurent Fignon – French cyclist, who won the Tour de France twice
 Horace Finaly – French banker, director general of the Banque de Paris et des Pays-Bas (Paribas)
 Hippolyte Flandrin, French painter
 Seymour Fleming – British noblewoman
 Robert de Flers – French playwright and journalist
 Suzanne Flon – actress
 Pierre François Léonard Fontaine – French Neo-classical Architect
 Jean de La Fontaine – French litterateur best known for fairy tales
 Thierry Fortineau – French actor
 Joseph Fourier – French mathematician and physicist
 Jean Françaix – French composer
 Pierre Frank – French Trotskyist politician
 William Temple Franklin – grandson of Benjamin Franklin
 Augustin-Jean Fresnel – French inventor of Fresnel Lens
 Loie Fuller – French dancer
 Marie-Madeleine Fourcade – also known as Madeline of the Resistance, leader of the French Resistance network "Alliance" during WWII

G

 Antonio de La Gandara – French painter
 Louis-Antoine Garnier-Pagès – French statesman
 Joseph Louis Gay-Lussac – French chemist and physicist
 Pierre Georges – French Resistance leader better known as Colonel Fabien
 Théodore Géricault – French Romantic painter, whose major work The Raft of the Medusa is reproduced on his tomb by sculptor Antoine Étex.
 Sophie Germain – early French mathematician, physicist, and philosopher
 Abdul Rahman Ghassemlou – leader of the Democratic Party of Iranian Kurdistan
 John Gilchrist (linguist) – linguist, surgeon, and Indologist from Scotland
 André Gill – French caricaturist
 Annie Girardot – French actress
 Piero Gobetti – Italian activist and journalist
 Manuel de Godoy – Spanish prime minister and court favorite
 Yvan Goll – French-German poet and his wife Claire Goll
 Enrique Gómez Carrillo – Guatemalan novelist, journalist, war correspondent, chronicler and diplomat
 François-Joseph Gossec — French composer
 Laurent de Gouvion Saint-Cyr – French military commander and Marshal of France
 Zénobe Gramme – inventor of the Direct Current (DC) Dynamo. There is a statue on the grave of Zénobe sitting and looking at a dynamo rotor.
 Stéphane Grappelli – French jazz violinist and member of the Quintette du Hot Club de France
 Eileen Gray – Irish architect and furniture designer
 André Grétry – Belgian-born French composer
 Maurice Grimaud – French Prefecture of Police during May 1968
 Giulia Grisi – Italian opera singer. Her grave is marked under her married name Giulia de Candia.
 Jean-Jacques Grunenwald – French musician
 Félix Guattari – French militant, institutional psychotherapist and philosopher
 Jules Guesde – French statesman
 Yvette Guilbert – actress and singer
 Joseph-Ignace Guillotin – proposed the guillotine as the official method of execution in France
 Jean Guillou – French musician
 Ernest Guiraud – French musician
 Yılmaz Güney – Kurdish/Turkish actor, film director, scenarist and novelist

H

 Melanie Hahnemann – French homeopathist, the first female doctor in homeopathy
 Samuel Hahnemann – German physician, founder of homeopathy
 Georges-Eugène Haussmann – French civil engineer and town planner
 Jeanne Hébuterne – French artist and common-law wife of the artist Amedeo Modigliani
 Sadeq Hedayat – Iran's foremost modern writer of prose fiction and short stories
 Héloïse – French abbess and scholar, best known for her love affair with Peter Abelard
 Juliette Heuzey - French writer
 Jacques Higelin – French singer
 Klementyna Hoffmanowa – Polish prose writer, popularizer, translator and editor
 Ticky Holgado – French actor
 Moritz Hochschild (1881-1965) - German-born mining entrepreneur in Latin America, saviour of Jews from the Holocaust
 Jean-Nicolas Huyot – French architect best known for his work on the Arc de Triomphe

I
 Jean Auguste Dominique Ingres – French painter
 Jean-Baptiste Isabey – French painter
 Charles Isabelle – French architect

J
 Claude Jade – French actress
 Edmond Jabès – French-Egyptian-Jewish writer and poet
 Léon Jouhaux – French trade union leader, won the Nobel Peace Prize in 1951
 Emil Jungfleisch – French biochemist

K

 Božidar Kantušer – American and Slovenian composer
 Bojidar Karageorgevitch – Serbian prince
 Allan Kardec – born Hippolyte Leon Denizard Rivail, founder of Spiritism
 Caroline Kauffmann – French feminist
 Ahmet Kaya – Turkish/Kurdish singer and songwriter and political exile
 François Christophe de Kellermann – French military commander and Marshal of France
 Patrick Kelly – American fashion designer
 Thomas Read Kemp – English property developer and statesman
 Alexander Khatisian – Prime Minister of Armenia
 Philippe Khorsand – French actor
 Henri Krasucki – French trade unionist
 Rodolphe Kreutzer – French violinist and composer

L
 Jean de La Fontaine – French fabulist
 Jérôme Lalande – French astronomer and writer
 René Lalique – French glass designer
 Édouard Lalo – French composer
 Pierre-Simon Laplace – French mathematician and astronomer (remains moved to Saint Julien de Mailloc in 1888)
 Theophanis Lamboukas – French actor and singer, husband of Édith Piaf
 Francisco Largo Caballero – Former president of the Spanish II Republic.
 Dominique Jean Larrey – French military surgeon
 Clarence John Laughlin – American Surrealist photographer from New Orleans, Louisiana. His most famous published work was Ghosts Along the Mississippi.
 Marie Laurencin – French painter
 William Lawless – Irish revolutionary and General in French Army
 Charles-François Lebrun – French statesman
 Alexandre Ledru-Rollin – French politician
 Louis James Alfred Lefébure-Wély – French organist and composer
 François Joseph Lefebvre – French military commander and Marshal of France
 Edith Lefel – French singer
 Raymond Lefevre – French easy listening orchestra leader, arranger and composer
 Paul Legrand – French mime
 Adrien Lejeune - French communard
 Marie Anne Lenormand – French cartomancer
 Ferdinand de Lesseps – French architect, designed the Suez Canal
 Pierre Levegh – French racing driver killed in the 1955 Le Mans disaster
 Jean-François Lyotard – French philosopher

M

 Jacques MacDonald – French military commander and Marshal of France
 William Madocks – English landowner and statesman
 Miłosz Magin – Polish composer
 Jeanne Margaine-Lacroix – French couturier 
 Nestor Makhno – Ukrainian Anarchist revolutionary
 Jacques-Antoine Manuel – French lawyer and statesman
 Auguste Maquet – French author
 Marcellin Marbot – French general
 Marcel Marceau – French mime artist
 Angelo Mariani – French chemist
 Célestine Marié – French opera singer
 André Masséna – French military commander and Marshal of France
 Hippolyte Mège-Mouriès – French chemist and inventor of margarine
 Étienne Méhul – French composer
 Georges Méliès – French filmmaker; produced A Trip to the Moon
 Émile-Justin Menier – French chocolatier
 Henri Menier – French chocolatier
 Antoine Brutus Menier – French chocolatier
 Maurice Merleau-Ponty – French philosopher
 Stuart Merrill – American symbolist poet
 Cléo de Mérode – French dancer
 Danielle Messia – French singer
 Charles Messier – French astronomer, publisher of Messier's catalogue
 Mezz Mezzrow – American Jazz clarinettist and saxophone player
 Teresa Milanollo – Italian violinist and composer, sister of Maria
 Maria Milanollo – Italian violinist; sister of Teresa
 Jules Michelet – French historian
 Borrah Minevitch – American harmonica player
 Amedeo Modigliani – Italian painter and sculptor
 Molière – French playwright
 Gustave de Molinari – Belgian-born economist associated with French laissez-faire liberal economists.
 Silvia Monfort – French comedian
 Gaspard Monge – French mathematician; remains later moved to the Panthéon
 Édouard Monnais – French journalist, theater director, playwright and librettist
 Yves Montand – film actor
 Charles Antoine Morand – French Napoleonic general
 Jim Morrison – American singer-songwriter and lead singer of The Doors, author, and poet. Permanent crowds and occasional vandalism surrounding this tomb have caused tensions with the families of other, less famous, interred individuals. Contrary to rumor, the lease of the gravesite was upgraded from thirty year to perpetual by Morrison's parents; the site is regularly guarded (due to graffiti and other nuisances).
 René Mouchotte – Battle of Britain fighter pilot and Free French Air Force wing commander
Léon Moussinac – French film critic and theorist 
 Jean Moulin – leader of the French Resistance during World War II who went missing after his arrest with several other Resistants at Caluire, Lyon in June 1943. Understood to have died on a train not far from Metz station in July that year, ashes 'presumed' to be his were interred at Père Lachaise after the war and then transferred to the Panthéon in December 1964.
 Marcel Mouloudji – French singer
 Georges Moustaki – French singer-songwriter
 Joachim Murat – King of Naples, French Napoleonic general and Marshal of France.
 Alfred de Musset – French poet, novelist, dramatist; love affair with George Sand is told from his point of view in his autobiographical novel, La Confession d'un Enfant du Siècle

N

 Félix Nadar – a French photographer, caricaturist, journalist, novelist and balloonist
 Étienne de Nansouty – General of Division, commander of the Guard cavalry during the Napoleonic Wars.
 Auguste Nélaton – Personal physician to Napoleon III
 Gérard de Nerval – French poet
 Michel Ney – Marshal of France, Prince of the Moskowa, who fought in the French Revolutionary Wars and the Napoleonic Wars
 Alwin Nikolais – American choreographer
 Anna de Noailles – French poet
 Charles Nodier – French writer
 Victor Noir – journalist killed by Pierre Napoleon Bonaparte in a dispute over a duel with Paschal Grousset. The tomb, designed by Jules Dalou, is notable for the realistic portrayal of the dead Noir.
 Cyprian Norwid – Polish poet
 Boghos Nubar – Armenian statesman and diplomat

O
 Krikor Odian – Armenian diplomat and statesman
 Pascale Ogier – French actress
 Virginia Oldoini, Countess of Castiglione – Italian noblewoman and socialite
 Max Ophüls – German film director
 Philippe Antoine d'Ornano – French soldier and political figure who rose to the rank of Marshal of France
 Louis-Guillaume Otto – French diplomat
 Gholam Ali Oveissi – Iranian military commander and statesman

P

 Camille Alfred Pabst – French painter
 Émile Henry Fauré Le Page – French gunsmith and former owner of Fauré Le Page
 Jean Le Page – French gunsmith and former owner of Fauré Le Page, then known as Le Page
 Trinidad Pardo de Tavera — Filipino physician, historian, and revolutionary
 Antoine Parmentier – French agronomist
 Alexandre Ferdinand Parseval-Deschenes – French admiral
 François-Auguste Parseval-Grandmaison – French poet, uncle of the above
 Christine Pascal – French actress
 Adelina Patti – Spanish-born opera singer
 Robert Herbert, 12th Earl of Pembroke – English aristocrat
 Charles Percier – French Neo-classical architect
 Georges Perec – French author
 Casimir Pierre Périer – French statesman
 Michel Petrucciani – French Jazz pianist
 Édith Piaf – French singer
 Georges Picquart – French general, involved in the Dreyfus affair
 Christian Pineau – French statesman
 Roland Piquepaille – French technology writer
 Camille Pissarro – French Impressionist painter
 Ignaz Pleyel – pianist, composer, and piano builder
 Eugène Pottier – French revolutionary socialist and poet, composed "The Internationale"
 Elvira Popescu – Romanian actress
 Francis Poulenc – French composer
 Antoine-Augustin Préault – French sculptor
 Marcel Proust – French novelist, essayist and critic
 Pierre-Paul Prud'hon – French painter

Q
 Yvonne Marie Elise Toussaint de Quiévrecourt
Gustave-Augustin Quesneville, French chemist and chemical manufacturer

R

 Mademoiselle Rachel – French actress
 François-Vincent Raspail – French scientist and statesman; remains later moved to the Panthéon
 Pierre-Joseph Redouté – Belgian botanic illustrator
 Michel-Louis-Étienne Regnaud de Saint-Jean d'Angély – French politician
 Laure Regnaud de Saint-Jean d'Angély – his wife and Lady of Court
 Jean-Baptiste Regnault – French painter
 Henri de Régnier – French poet
 Frantz Reichel – French sportsman and journalist
 Grace Renzi – American painter
 Norbert Rillieux – American engineer, invented the multiple-effect evaporator
 Étienne-Gaspard Robert – Belgian magician who performed under the stage name of Robertson
 Jacob Roblès – Famous grave for the medallion Silence (1842) by Antoine-Augustin Préault
 Waldeck Rochet – French politician, and General Secretary of the Communist Party of France 1964-1972
 Georges Rodenbach – Belgian poet
 Jean Rollin – French director and novelist
 Jules Romains – French writer
 Robbie Ross - friend of Oscar Wilde (ashes interred in Wilde’s tomb)
 Gioachino Rossini – Italian composer. In 1887, Rossini's remains were moved back to Florence, but the crypt that once housed them (now dedicated to his memory) still stands in Perè Lachaise.
 Edmond James de Rothschild – Baron of the Rothschild family (in the family vault), moved to Ramat HaNadiv later
 James Mayer de Rothschild – (in the family vault in Division 7)
 Salomon James de Rothschild – son of James Mayer de Rothschild (in the family vault)
 Raymond Roussel – writer
 Alphonse Royer – French poet and dramatist

S

 Dr. Sadegh Sharafkandi – Kurdish politician and leader of Democratic Party of Iranian Kurdistan
 Gholam-Hossein Sa'edi – Iranian socialist novelist and playwright
 Countess Consuelo de Saint Exupéry – Salvadoran writer, wife of Antoine de Saint-Exupéry
 Étienne Geoffroy Saint-Hilaire – French naturalist
 Claude Henri de Rouvroy, comte de Saint-Simon – French sociologist who founded the "Saint-Simonian" movement
 Henri Salvador – French singer
 Yuliya Samoylova – Russian aristocrat
 Jean-Baptiste Say – French economist
 Victor Schœlcher – French statesman known for the abolition of slavery, Schœlcher's remains were transferred to the Panthéon on 20 May 1949
 Eugène Scribe – French librettist and playwright
 Raymond Adolphe Séré de Rivières – French general and military engineer
 Georges-Pierre Seurat – French painter of A Sunday Afternoon on the Island of La Grande Jatte, and father of neo-impressionism
 Shahan Shahnour – Armenian writer and novelist
 Emmanuel-Joseph Sieyès – French clergyman, philosopher and statesman
 Paul Signac – French painter
 Simone Signoret – Academy-award-winning French actress.
 Sidney Smith – British admiral, of whom Napoleon Bonaparte said "That man made me miss my destiny".
 Albert Soboul – French historian
 Joseph Spiess – French inventor of the rigid airship
 Eugène Spuller – French politician, Minister of Foreign Affairs and Minister of Education
 Serge Alexandre Stavisky – French financier
 Gertrude Stein – American author
 John Hurford Stone — British radical political reformer and publisher
 Elisabeta Alexandrovna Stroganova – Francophile Russian aristocrat
 Louis Gabriel Suchet – French military commander and Marshal of France
 Feliks Sypniewski – Polish painter and exiled Restoration of Poland advocate

T

 Eugenia Tadolini – Italian opera singer
 François-Joseph Talma – French actor
 Pierre Alexandre Tardieu – French engraver
 Gerda Taro – German war photographer and the great love of Robert Capa, also one of the iconographers of the Spanish Civil War. The monument is by Alberto Giacometti.
 J. R. D. Tata – Indian aviation pioneer and former head of Tata Group; Bharat Ratna and Legion of Honour
 Pavel Tchelitchew – Russian artist and painter
 Tapa Tchermoeff – First Prime Minister of the Mountainous Republic of the Northern Caucasus
 Thomas Tellefsen – Norwegian pianist and composer
 Ruben Ter-Minasian – Armenian politician and a revolutionary, member of Armenian Revolutionary Federation ARF Tashnag
 Adolphe Thiers – French historian and statesman
 Maurice Thorez – French Communist politician
 Isaac Titsingh – Dutch surgeon, scholar, VOC trader, ambassador to Qing China and Tokugawa Japan
 Alice B. Toklas – American author, partner of Gertrude Stein, Toklas' name and information is etched on the other side of Stein's gravestone in the same sparse style and font.
 Daniel Toscan du Plantier – French film producer
 Lise Tréhot – French art model notable for Pierre Auguste-Renoir's early Salon period
 Marie Trintignant – French actress
 Maurice Tourneur – French film director
 Rafael Trujillo – former dictator of the Dominican Republic

U
 Marie-Renée Ucciani – French artist
 Gaspard Ulliel – French actor

V

 Paul Vaillant-Couturier – French political journalist
 Pierre-Henri de Valenciennes – French painter
 Jules Vallès – French writer
 Bernard Verlhac (Tignous) – French cartoonist killed in the Charlie Hebdo shooting
 Louis Verneuil – French playwright
 Claude Victor-Perrin – French military commander and Marshal of France
 Louis Visconti – French architect best known for designing the modern Louvre and Napoleon's tomb at Les Invalides
 Dominique Vivant, Baron de Denon – French artist, writer, diplomat and archaeologist. Located close to Chopin's grave.
 Louis Vivin – French naive painter.
 Volin – Russian anarchist intellectual.
 Constantin François de Chassebœuf, comte de Volney – French enlightenment philosopher and author of Meditations On The Ruins of Empires, translated by Thomas Jefferson.

W
 Émile Waldteufel – French composer
 Countess Marie Walewska – Napoleon's mistress, credited for pressing Napoleon to take important pro-Polish decisions during the Napoleonic Wars. Only her heart is entombed here, in the tomb of the d'Ornano family; her other remains were returned to her native Poland.
 Sir Richard Wallace – English art collector and philanthropist
 Herbert Ward – English sculptor and explorer
 Eduard Wiiralt – Estonian artist
 Oscar Wilde – Irish novelist, poet and playwright. By tradition, Wilde's admirers kiss the Art Deco monument while wearing red lipstick, though this practice will no longer be allowed because of the damage it has caused to his tomb, which had to be repaired and encased in a glass screen. Wilde died in 1900 and was initially buried in the Cimetière de Bagneux. His remains were transferred in 1909 to Père Lachaise. The tomb is also the resting place of the ashes of Robert Ross, who commissioned the monument.
 Helen Maria Williams—English poet, translator, and political writer, who became an expatriate in Paris and chronicled the French Revolution for English readers.
 Jeanette Wohl – French literary editor, longtime friend and correspondent of Ludwig Börne
 Richard Wright – American author, wrote Native Son and other American classics

Y
 Claude-Alexandre Ysabeau – French revolutionary

Z
 Achille Zavatta – French clown
 Félix Ziem – French painter

See also

References

 
Pere Lachaise Cemetery